Phil Bentham (born 28 October 1971) is a Premier League football VAR coach and former English professional rugby league Referee & video referee. He was one of the Rugby Football League's full-time match officials since its inception in 2007. Bentham was referee in seven major finals and video referee in nine major finals.

Background
Bentham was born in Leigh, Lancashire, England.

First games
Bentham's refereed his first professional match between Sheffield Eagles and London Skolars on 22 February 2004. His first Super League match was Wakefield Trinity versus Hull F.C. on 11 September 2005.

Major finals
Bentham was referee for both the 2011 and 2014 Super League grand finals. He was also the video referee in the 2009, 2012, 2015, and 2017 Super League grand finals.

He was the touch judge in the 2005 Challenge Cup Final. He was the referee in the 2011, 2013, 2014. and 2017 Challenge Cup finals. Bentham was the video referee for the 2007, 2009, and 2012 Challenge Cup finals.

He has also refereed in the 2014 Four Nations Final in Wellington, New Zealand

International
 He was Touch Judge on GB v Aus in 2003
 He refereed Wales v Scotland in 2007.
 He was the video referee in France v England on 24 October 2009 in the 4 Nations.
 He was the Video ref for France v NZ on 31 October 2009 in the 4 Nations and 2009 4 Nations Final.
 He has refereed Italy v Serbia on 8 November 2009.
He was appointed ref for all matches at the 2010 Atlantic Cup in Florida.
2011 Australia v NZ Test referee
He was referee in the 2011 Four Nations tournament and Video Referee in the final
he was Referee and Video Referee in the 2013 World Cup (UK / France)
Referee - 2014 Four Nations Final (AUS vs NZ)
Video Referee - 2015 England v NZ Test
Referee and Video Referee 2017 World Cup (Australia / NZ / PNG)
He refereed the 2017 World Cup QF Australia v Samoa
Video Referee - 2018 England v NZ Test

Injuries
On 4 May 2012, Bentham was refereeing the Super League clash between Wigan and Hull Kingston Rovers at the DW Stadium live on Sky Sports, when he collided during an off-the-ball incident with Rovers' Shannon McDonnell after 17 minutes, and suffered a fractured tibia. He was given oxygen while being carried off on a stretcher whilst being applauded from the crowds and was taken to the Royal Albert Edward Infirmary in Wigan; touch judge Robert Hicks took over as referee, and Andrew Smith the reserve official took Hicks' place on the line. Wigan went on to win 36–22. Bentham returned to full on-field duties at the start of 2013 Super League Season.

On 16 May 2015, Bentham was refereeing Leeds Rhinos v Huddersfield Giants at Headingley Carnegie Stadium live on BBC when he did not return after the half time interval due to a hamstring injury. Touch Judge Jonathan Roberts replaced Bentham in the middle as he was the most senior referee having experience in the Championship & League 1 competitions. Reserve Official Phil Graham took Roberts' place on the line. Leeds went on to win 48–16.

On 16 February 2018, Bentham was refereeing Widnes Vikings v Warrington Wolves at the Halton Stadium live on Sky Sports when Chris Houston collided with him causing him to hit the ground heavily, landing on his back and the 'ref cam' equipment. Bentham had to leave the field due to his injuries. Touch judge Scott Mikalauskas took over as referee and Marcus Griffiths the Reserve Official took Mikalauskas' place on the line. Mikalauskas placed the collision between Bentham and Houston on report and Houston was subsequently banned for 2 matches. In the same fixture in 2017, also televised on Sky Sports, Bentham was the referee and Houston knocked him over in that fixture but was found not guilty by an Independent Rules Tribunal. Bentham has not refereed since this incident and it is doubtful he will return to the field due to slipping a disc in his neck.

References

External links 
 RFL profile
 Phil Bentham profile
 Phil Bentham on RL Project

1971 births
Living people
English rugby league referees
Sportspeople from Leigh, Greater Manchester
Rugby League World Cup referees